Milen Ivanov (born 10 May 1993) is a Bulgarian footballer who plays as a midfielder for Marek Dupnitsa.

References 

1993 births
Living people
Bulgarian footballers
Association football midfielders
First Professional Football League (Bulgaria) players
PFC CSKA Sofia players
FC Tsarsko Selo Sofia players
FC CSKA 1948 Sofia players
PFC Marek Dupnitsa players